EEVA, Eesti vanema kirjanduse digitaalne tekstikogu (Estonian for 'Digital Text Repository for Older Estonian Literature'), is a project of the University of Tartu Library, Department of Literature and Folklore of the University of Tartu and Estonian Literary Museum to digitise old texts that are important to Estonian literature history, thus allowing wide readership to access them while sparing the (almost invariably rare) originals.

External links 
 

2002 establishments in Estonia
Estonian literature
University of Tartu
Databases in Estonia